Samagidi or Asamagidi is a town in Kokori sub-clan in Agbon Kingdom in Ethiope East Local Government Council Area of Delta State in Nigeria.

Geography
Samagidi is bounded by Eku in the West, Okuidjerhe in the East, Urushue and orogun in the North, and Onumane and Okpara in the South.

Education
There is a school, Ibruvwe Grammar School, in the village.

Residents
Prominent indigenes include Chief Godwin Ogbetuo, the late Chief James Edewor, Mason Oghenejobor, Austin Oghenejobor,  Sonny Akpoduado, Professor Vincent Otokunefor and Chief Emma Avworo who is the current President-General, Dr. Oghenegueke Chris Ejiro.

Industry
Samagidi is an oil producing community in the Kokori oil field.

References

Populated places in Delta State